John Hall Buchanan Jr. (March 19, 1928 – March 5, 2018) was an American politician who served as a Republican in the U.S. House of Representatives from 1965 to 1981, representing Alabama's 6th congressional district.

Background
A native of Paris, Tennessee, Buchanan served in the United States Navy from 1945 to 1946 and then relocated to Alabama to attend Samford University in Birmingham. After his graduation, Buchanan did graduate work at the University of Virginia at Charlottesville, before he transferred to the Southern Baptist Theological Seminary in Louisville, Kentucky. In 1957, he graduated from the seminary and served as pastor of churches in Tennessee, Alabama, and Virginia.

Early political campaigns
In 1962, Buchanan, while still an active pastor in Birmingham, was one of three unsuccessful Republican candidates for Congress. The U.S. House candidates that year ran statewide. Because state law required that voters support eight candidates for their ballot to count, the Republicans had to back five Democrats, who were technically their at-large opponents, or to write in the names of five Republicans who were not official candidates, a process that proved too burdensome to overcome. The congressional race corresponded with the controversial admission of James Meredith, who became the first African American in history to graduate from the University of Mississippi in neighboring Mississippi. Buchanan said that the Alabama congressional delegation had responded to the desegregation crisis "only after intense pressure from the home folks. ... they nodded their heads 'yes' when the Kennedys asked them to, and have come back home and denied they were national Democrats." Buchanan led the three-candidate field in 1962 with 141,202 votes but failed to dislodge the eighth-place  Democratic candidate, Representative Carl Elliott of Jasper.

Buchanan was also the finance director for the resurgent Alabama Republican Party. In 1964, he was handily elected to Congress from the Birmingham-based 6th district, having unseated the 10-year incumbent Democrat, George Huddleston Jr., by a staggering 21-point margin.  This was particularly shocking since the Republican Party had been more or less nonexistent in Alabama for the better part of 80 years.  Indeed, most of the 6th's living residents had never been represented by a Republican before.  However, Alabama voters turned against the Democrats after Lyndon Johnson signed the Civil Rights Act of 1964 into law.  Partly as a result, Barry Goldwater easily carried the district en route to winning 69 percent of Alabama's popular vote.

Congressional tenure

Among the significant legislation passed during his tenure was the Twenty-fifth Amendment to the United States Constitution which clarifies and refines the office of the Vice President of the United States, the Medicare Act, which Buchanan opposed, and the 1965 Voting Rights Act.

Buchanan was a moderate-to-liberal Republican. Although he had been elected over local anger at the Civil Rights Act,his tenure was marked by strong advocacy for civil rights and women's rights. In his first term, he worked with Democratic Congressman Charles Weltner to spearhead an investigation of the Ku Klux Klan. The FBI credited Buchanan and Weltner's efforts for bringing KKK membership to its lowest level since World War II.  He was the first Alabama congressman to hire staff and nominate to the military academies on a bi-racial basis.

As a senior member of the House Committee on Education and Labor, Buchanan helped lead the fight in 1972 in the House for enactment of the Education Act, Title IX, which requires equality for women in the programs of American colleges and universities, including athletics. He served as ranking Republican on the Equal Rights Subcommittee and the subcommittee with jurisdiction over the arts. For fourteen years, he was a member of the Foreign Affairs Committee, where he championed the rights of people behind the Iron Curtain, especially Jewish and Christian dissidents, as well as the black majorities in Southern Rhodesia and South Africa.  As ranking minority member of the House Committee on Foreign Affairs Subcommittee on International Operations, he was one of the principal authors of the Foreign Service Act of 1980.  In that year he received the Honor Award, Women's Action Organization (State Department, ICA, AID) and the Honor Award "for commitment to the advancement of women in the Foreign Service community".

He served as a member of the U. S. delegation to the 28th United Nations General Assembly, and to the Sixth Special Assembly, having ambassadorial rank with each appointment. He was a member of the U. S. delegation to the U. N. Human Rights Commission (1978–1980), was ranking Republican to the Commission on Security and Cooperation in Europe, and was a member of the U.S. Delegation to the Belgrade Conference on the Helsinki Accords. Largely due to his liberal record and support of civil rights, Buchanan became very popular in his district, even though Democrats continued to hold most local offices in the district well into the 1980s. He was reelected seven times, rarely facing serious opposition. In 1978, however, he was challenged in the primary by a considerably more conservative Republican, Albert L. Smith Jr., a longtime party activist in the Birmingham area. Buchanan fended him off but was defeated in a rematch in 1980.

Affiliations 

Upon leaving Congress in 1981, he was appointed by President Ronald W. Reagan as a member of the U.S. delegation to the United Nations. He has also served on the United Nations Human Rights Committee. Buchanan was also on the board of directors of the liberal group, People for the American Way, founded by producer Norman Lear. For many years, he served as PFAW's national chairman.

In that capacity, he traveled extensively, participating in frequent debates with leaders of the Religious Right on radio, television, and various platforms throughout the United States. Appearances in the media included McNeil-Lehrer NewsHour, Crossfire, Larry King Live, Charlie Rose, and other news programs. He also spoke extensively for national organizations including the Council for the Advancement of Citizenship, the Kettering Foundation, and the Close-Up Foundation.

Buchanan's numerous awards have included the National Council of Jewish Women Hannah G. Solomon Award, the Common Cause Public Service Achievement Award, the National Conference of Christians and Jews Brotherhood Award, and an award from the Self-Determination for D. C. National Coalition. He served on the Common Cause President's Council, the National Council of the U.S. United Nations Association, and the Board of Advisors and Speakers Bureau of the Close-Up Foundation. He also served as the board chairman of Fund-Balance, LLC and the Nexus Holdings Group.

In 2010, Buchanan was inducted into the Alabama Academy of Honor for his congressional contributions to furthering the rights of women and African Americans. After his defeat, Buchanan never returned to Alabama and he lived in Bethesda, Maryland. He and his wife Betty have two daughters and three granddaughters.

Death
Buchanan died on March 5, 2018, in an assisted living center in Rockville, Maryland, from dementia.

See also
 List of members of the House Un-American Activities Committee

References

External links

1928 births
2018 deaths
American clergy
Southern Baptist Theological Seminary alumni
Samford University alumni
United States Navy personnel of World War II
People from Paris, Tennessee
Politicians from Birmingham, Alabama
People from Bethesda, Maryland
Military personnel from Tennessee
Republican Party members of the United States House of Representatives from Alabama
People for the American Way people
Maryland Republicans
Deaths from dementia in Maryland
Religious leaders from Birmingham, Alabama
Military personnel from Birmingham, Alabama